Richard Li Han-hsiang (7 March 1926 in Jinxi, Liaoning – 17 December 1996 in Beijing) was a Chinese film director. Li directed more than 70 films in his career beginning in the 1950s and lasting till the 1990s. His The Enchanting Shadow, The Magnificent Concubine, and Empress Wu Tse-Tien were entered into the Cannes Film Festival in 1960, 1962, and 1963 respectively.

Li also won the Golden Horse Film Festival and Awards for his work on the movie Xi Shi in 1965. Most of his movies in the 1970s and 1980s were Chinese historical dramas. He died in Beijing due to a heart attack. He was seventy.

Filmography

Films 
This is a partial list of films.

Awards 
 Star. Avenue of Stars. Tsim Sha Tsui waterfront in Hong Kong.

See also
 Stone House (Diamond Hill)

References

External links
 Li Han-Hsiang at filmaffinity.com

 HK cinemagic entry
 Li Han-hsiang at senscritique.com

1926 births
1996 deaths
Hong Kong film directors
People from Huludao
Film directors from Liaoning
Chinese film directors